Turan-e Tork (also Romanized as Tūrān-e Tork; also known as Tūrān) is a village in Daland Rural District, in the Central District of Ramian County, Golestan Province, Iran. At the 2006 census, its population was 1,146, in 265 families.

References 

Populated places in Ramian County